Wildwood Park Historic District may refer to the following places:
Wildwood Park Historic District (Fort Wayne, Indiana), listed on the National Register of Historic Places
Wildwood Park Historic District (Charles City, Iowa), listed on the National Register of Historic Places